Kỳ Sơn is a former district of Hòa Bình province in the Northwest region of Vietnam. As of 2003 the district had a population of 34,800. The district covers an area of 202 km². The district capital lies at Kỳ Sơn.

The district was annexed by the city of Hòa Bình on December 17, 2019.

References

Former districts of Vietnam